Bruno III of Berg (German: Bruno III von Berg) was Archbishop of Cologne and Duke of Westphalia from 1191 until 1193.

The fifth son of Adolf IV, Count of Berg, he is first mentioned in 1156 as provost of St. George in Cologne, and in 1168 as provost at Cologne Cathedral. Named in 1191 Archbishop of Cologne, he resigned in 1193, and finished his life as a monk in Altenberg. He died in 1193, and is buried in Altenberg.

Literature
 Lewald, Ursula, 'Die Ezzonen. Das Schicksal eines rheinischen Fürstengeschlechts', in Rheinische Vierteljahrsblätter 43 (1979) pp. 120–168

12th-century births
1193 deaths

Year of birth unknown
Archbishops of Cologne
House of Berg
House of Limburg-Stirum
Bruno 01
12th-century Roman Catholic archbishops in the Holy Roman Empire